The Little River Railroad is a historic class III railroad that operated between Maryville and Elkmont, Tennessee, during the period 1901 to 1939.

History
The Little River Railroad ("the LRR") was established as a subsidiary of the Little River Lumber Company on November 21, 1901. Colonel W. B. Townsend was the owner of both entities.

The LRR was primarily a logging railroad. By the time Little River Lumber Company completed operations in 1939, it had harvested two billion board feet (4,700,000 m³) of lumber from the Little River watershed.

The LRR typically would build a line into an area, complete the logging, then remove the line. In all, the LRR built  of track, none of which remains.

The LRR operated several forms of equipment during its lifetime. The primary logging locomotive was the Shay. The LRR also utilized the 4-6-2 Pacific and the first 2-4-4-2 Mallet articulated. In addition, the LRR owned a rail bus and Col. W.B. Townsend utilized a rail car.

In 1925 Col. Townsend agreed to deed all of the holdings of the Little River Lumber Company to the Great Smoky Mountains National Park for $273,557, or $3.58 an acre. This purchase represented a milestone in the eventual creation of the park.  The purchase permitted the Little River Lumber Company to continue logging within the park boundaries until 1938. In 1939 the LRR ended operations.

Today, the Little River Lumber Co & Railroad Museum in Townsend, Tennessee, preserves the history of the LRR.

Route
The LRR had a main line which ran from Maryville, through Walland and Sunshine to Townsend. The line of the LRR roughly follows US 321 and TN 73 today. Townsend was the site of the Little River Lumber Company's sawmill.  The main line continued to the confluence of the Little River and the West Prong of the Little River at a spot now known as the Townsend Y.  The western branch led to Tremont, where a small logging community was located.  The eastern branch led to Elkmont, where a larger logging community and a recreational community were located (see Wonderland Hotel).

The LRR roadbed still winds its way along the Little River from Townsend to Elkmont as the Little River Gorge Road or TN 73.  Within this section of the Great Smoky Mountains National Park are numerous trails that owe their existence to the LRR.  All of the "Quiet Walkways" except Bote Mountain Road between Gatlinburg and Cades Cove are former LRR road bed.

References

Little River Lumber Co & Railroad Museum
Birth of a National Park, Carlos C. Campbell, University of Tennessee Press, Knoxville, 1960
At Home in the Smokies, National Park Service U.S. Department of the Interior, 1984

Defunct Tennessee railroads
Great Smoky Mountains National Park
Transportation in Blount County, Tennessee
Transportation in Sevier County, Tennessee
Townsend, Tennessee
Railroad museums in Tennessee